Vuelta Asturias is a professional cycle road race held in Spain in early May each year. The event was first run in 1925 but has not been held consistently until 1968 to present. Since 2005, the race has been organised as a 2.1 event on the UCI Europe Tour.

On 25 April 2014, the Vuelta Asturias was suspended one week before its start due to the lack of funds and sponsors. The race returned in 2015, when a two-stage edition was won by Igor Antón.

Winners

Notes

References

External links
 

 
UCI Europe Tour races
Asturias
Sport in Asturias
Recurring sporting events established in 1925
1925 establishments in Spain